The New South Wales Mounted Brigade was a mounted infantry brigade of the Colony of New South Wales.

History
The brigade was formed on 1 August 1893, consisting of the New South Wales Cavalry (Lancers) and the New South Wales Mounted Rifles. The brigade expanded in 1897 with the addition of the 1st Australian Horse.

Structure
At formation in 1893, the brigade had the following structure:
New South Wales Cavalry (Lancers) Commanding Officer: (vacant), Adjutant: Captain George Leonard Lee
1st Squadron – Commanding Officer: Captain Alexander James Dodds
Sydney
Parramatta
2nd Squadron – Commanding Officer: Captain John J. Walters
Illawarra
West Camden
3rd Squadron – Commanding Officer: Captain W. Cracknell
Hunter River
4th Squadron – Commanding Officer: Captain C.E. Taylor
Lismore
Richmond River

New South Wales Mounted Rifles Commanding Officer: Major Harry Lassetter – Adjutant: Captain Henry Glendower Bodysham Sparrow
1st Company – Commanding Officer: Captain A.F. Lloyd
Liverpool
Campbelltown
2nd Company – Commanding Officer: Captain John Macquarie Antill
Picton
Camden
3rd Company – Commanding Officer: Captain Frederick Bland
Bega
Queanbeyan
4th Company – Commanding Officer: Captain Charles Henry Edward Chauvel
Tenterfield
Inverell

The structure of the 1st Australian Horse added to the brigade in 1897, was as follows:

1st Australian Horse Commanding Officer: Captain Kenneth Mackay – Adjutant: Lieutenant R. R. Thompson
A squadron
Murrumburrah
Cootamundra
Gundagai
B squadron
Goulburn
Braidwood-Araluen
Michelago-Bredbo
Bungendore
C squadron
Mudgee
Rylstone
Lue
D squadron
Scone
Belltrees
Muswellbrook
E squadron
Armidale
Tamworth
Gunnedah
Boggabri

Commanding officer
Macdonald, Malcolm Melville

References  
Notes  

Infantry units and formations of Australia
N
Colony of New South Wales